Arthur Weakley (born 30 April 1939) is a South African former cricketer. He played in one List A and twenty first-class matches from 1961/62 to 1980/81.

References

External links
 

1939 births
Living people
South African cricketers
Border cricketers
Griqualand West cricketers
People from Queenstown, South Africa
Cricketers from the Eastern Cape